Old Murder House Theater (OHMT) is a theater company out of Austin, Texas recreating feature films at various venues and on tour.

Background
It was formed in 2008 by Sam Eidson and Josh Jones and adapts classics from the 1980s and 1990s. Productions have included RoboCop, Predator, Aliens, Die Hard, Home Alone, Back to the Future, and Jurassic Park. The movie Aliens was adapted into a show in 2011 titled Aliens on Ice. In 2012 the troupe went on tour with "Jurassic Park Live" on an all-US tour from NY to LA. Their last production was an adaptation of "Jaws Live" at the Scottish Rite Theater in Austin Texas in 2015. Cardboard and homemade props are used and a sexual innuendos are added into the adaptations including a dinosaur sex scene in Jurassic Park.

References

External links
 
Interview with Sam Edison of Old Murder House Theatre
Epic Jaws Live performance
Die Hard
Waay off Broadway

Cinemas and movie theaters in Texas
Entertainment companies established in 2008
American companies established in 2008
2008 establishments in Texas